Edward Chawke (9 May 1918 – 26 December 1980) was an Irish hurler. At club level he played for Granagh, winning a  Limerick Junior Championship title in 1942, and was right corner-forward on the Limerick senior hurling team that won the 1940 All-Ireland Championship.

References

1918 births
1980 deaths
Granagh-Ballingarry hurlers
Limerick inter-county hurlers
All-Ireland Senior Hurling Championship winners